Pierre Combescot (9 January 1940 Limoges – 27 June 2017) was a French journalist and writer. He worked for the Canard Enchaîné, under the pseudonym Luc Décygnes. He was also a columnist in Paris Match.

Awards
 1986 Prix Médicis, for The Funeral of the Sardine
 1991 Prix Goncourt, for Les Filles du Calvaire.
 Prince Pierre de Monaco Prize

Works
 Louis II de Bavière, Lattès, 1974
 Les Chevaliers du crépuscule, Lattès 1975 (ASIN B0000DQ1EB)
 Les Funérailles de la Sardine, Grasset – 1986
 Les Petites Mazarines, Grasset 1990 
 Les Filles du Calvaire, Grasset – 1991
 La Sainte famille, Grasset 1996
 Le Songe du Pharaon, Grasset 1998
 Lansquenet, Grasset 2002
 Les Diamants de la guillotine, Robert Laffont 2003
 Ce soir on soupe chez Pétrone, Grasset 2004
 Pour mon plaisir et ma délectation charnelle, Grasset 2009

References

1940 births
2017 deaths
People from Limoges
Writers from Nouvelle-Aquitaine
French male writers
Prix Goncourt winners
Prix Médicis winners
Prix Goncourt des lycéens winners